Siedlce Department (Polish: Departament siedlecki) was a unit of administrative division and local government in Polish Duchy of Warsaw in years 1809–1815.

Its capital city was Siedlce, and it was further divided onto 9 powiats.

In 1815 it was transformed into Podlasie Voivodeship.

Departments of the Duchy of Warsaw